Cara Black and Els Callens were the defending champions, but Callens did not compete this year. Black teamed up with Rennae Stubbs and lost in semifinals to Stéphanie Foretz and Michaëlla Krajicek.

Dinara Safina and Katarina Srebotnik won the title by defeating Stéphanie Foretz and Michaëlla Krajicek 6–1, 6–1 in the final.

Seeds

Draw

Draw

References
 Main and Qualifying Rounds

2006 Doubles
Proximus Diamond Games
Proximus Diamond Games